Vanga Airport  is an airport serving the town of Vanga in Kwilu Province, Democratic Republic of the Congo.

Airport facilities are run and maintained by Mission Aviation Fellowship.

See also

Transport in the Democratic Republic of the Congo
 List of airports in the Democratic Republic of the Congo

References

External links
OpenStreetMap - Vanga
 HERE Maps - Vanga
 OurAirports - Vanga
 FallingRain - Vanga

Airports in Kwilu Province